Sharon Gusberti (born August 6, 1964) is an Italian film actress and fashion model.

Career 
Following her debut in the film Yuppies by Carlo Vanzina in 1986, she went on to star in the same year's Via Montenapoleone by the same director.

In the year ahead, she was cast as Sharon Zampetti in the television series I Ragazzi Della 3ª C. She was portrayed as the snobbish daughter of industrialist Camillo Zampetti (played by Guido Nicheli). She disappeared from the screen following the third and final seasons of the show.

She reappeared on television in Meteore and Stracult and was interviewed by the radio host Max Novaresi of R101 in 2007.

Personal life 
According to her statements, she is married to a Milanese nobleman. She left the entertainment industry to devote her time to their daughter. Her family resides with her in Milan.

References

External links
 
 Interview to Sharon Gusberti (Italian)

1964 births
Living people
Italian actors